The Go is an American rock band from Detroit, Michigan. Founded in 1996, the group released seven studio albums before their indefinite hiatus in 2013.

History 
The Go was established in Detroit in 1996 by Bobby Harlow, John Krautner, and Marc Fellis. Mentored by Los Angeles producer Kim Fowley, the band signed a record deal with Sub Pop in 1998. Their first album, Whatcha Doin featured Dave Buick on bass and Jack White on guitar. The album was produced by Outrageous Cherry frontman Matthew Smith and supported with three national tours. After Whatcha Doin', the band parted ways with White, returning to the studio in 2000 to record their sophomore album Free Electricity with Dion Fischer on lead guitar, John Olson (of Wolf Eyes) on saxophone, and Cary Loren (of Destroy All Monsters) on tamboura. The sound of Free Electricity significantly differed from its predecessor and the album was ultimately shelved by Sub Pop.

Another round of personnel changes saw the departure of Buick and Fischer along with the addition of guitarist Kenny Tudrick. Under the management of Howard Hertz, the band signed with Lizard King Records. The Go's self-titled third album was recorded in the UK and released in 2003. It was bolstered with an opening slot on the White Stripes' "Elephant" tour. With little promotion for The Go in the United States, the band parted ways with Lizard King Records and returned to Detroit with new guitarist, James McConnell.

While in Detroit, The Go received word that Welsh singer Adele Nozedar had taken an interest in the band, securing funding for a new album. With Harlow serving as producer, The Go released Howl on the Haunted Beat You Ride in 2007 to critical acclaim. It won Album of the Year at the Detroit Music Awards and received the approval of the Allen Ginsberg Foundation for Harlow's musical interpretation of the poem "Refrain". The Go promoted the release with extensive American tours supporting Guided by Voices, and were invited to perform at the Peace Jam Foundation Conference in Denver in 2008. The conference earned the band a private audience with the 14th Dalai Lama. After further performances, a follow-up double LP was released jointly on Bellyache Records. The band also began collaborating with Don Was, recording a song produced by Was and engineered by longtime friend Steve King.

By 2007, The Go had begun working with Burger Records, whose owners Sean Bohrman and Lee Rickard had long been fans of the band. In 2010, Burger released an LP by the Go's alternate project, Conspiracy of Owls, which featured songwriters Harlow, Krautner, and Fellis, along with a live lineup of fellow Detroit musicians (Steve Nawara, Johnny Lzr, and "Magic" Jake Culkowski). Singer Robert Pollard of Guided By Voices provided artwork for the LP as well as inspiration for the name of the band. After supporting the Conspiracy of Owls record with shows at SXSW, Harlow and Culkowski formed a new band, Magic Jake & The Power Crystals, in which they shared songwriting duties.

In 2012, Burger Records released a five-cassette box set of previously unheard and alternate Go tracks spanning 1996–2007. The Go followed this up with Fiesta, which was released on limited edition colored vinyl on Burger Records (US) and on black vinyl with alternate artwork by Mauvaise Foi Records (France).

In 2016, The Go were included in Third Man Records' Live at the Gold Dollar Vault package, which released a live LP from the band's 1999 lineup featuring Jack White. The Go were also featured on Iggy Pop's satellite radio show.

The Go's music has been included in commercials, television, and films, including My Name Is Earl, Entourage and The Hills Have Eyes.

Discography

References

External links 
Band website
BBC's review of Howl on the Haunted Beat You Ride

Sub Pop artists
Musical groups from Detroit
Garage punk groups
1996 establishments in Michigan
Garage rock groups from Michigan
Third Man Records artists